John Bowden (died 1822) was an Irish architect and member of the Board of First Fruits of the Church of Ireland from 1813 to 1821. He was born in Dublin and died in 1822.

Bowden, having studied at the Dublin Society's School of Architectural Drawing between May 1798 and 1802, won premiums in 1799, 1801 (as 'John Boden', ex-pupil) and 1802. He served his apprenticeship with Sir Richard Morrison. He designed many churches and courthouses around the country including St. Stephen's Church of Ireland (Pepper Canister), Mount Street, Dublin. St Stephen's was completed by his student Joseph Welland after his death.

In 1817 he entered the competition for the Wellington Testimonial in the Phoenix Park, Dublin. 

By 1818 he had also become architect to the Board of Education.

Selection of Works
 Foyle College, Derry, County Londonderry (1808–1814)
 St. George's Parish Church, Belfast (1811–1816)
 Antrim Castle, County Antrim (1813)
 Dundalk Courthouse, Dundalk, County Louth (1813–1818) Supervisor
 St. Paul's Tartaraghan, Portadown, County Armagh (1816)
 Derry Courthouse, Derry, County Londonderry (1822)
 St Fiaac's Church, Clonegal (1818) 
 Church of Ireland, County Cavan (1820)
 St. Cronan's Church, Roscrea (Church of Ireland)
 St. Stephen's Church of Ireland (Pepper Canister), Mount Street, Dublin (1821–1824) Designed by John Bowden and completed by Joseph Welland.
 St. Philip and St. James Church, Booterstown, Dublin (1821–1824) Designed by John Bowden and completed by Joseph Welland

References

External links
Buildings on Farnham Street
John Bowden at Archiseek.com

Architects from Dublin (city)
Irish ecclesiastical architects
1822 deaths
Year of birth unknown